Peter Zavadil is an American music video director who works primarily in the field of country music. He has directed many music videos since the late 1990s. He has won the Country Music Association Award for Video of the Year twice from seven nominations, first in 2001 for "Born to Fly" by Sara Evans and again in 2002 for Brad Paisley's "I'm Gonna Miss Her".

Music videos directed
175 music videos are currently listed here.

References

External links

Peter Zavadil at MVDbase.com

American music video directors
Living people
Place of birth missing (living people)
Year of birth missing (living people)